Aleksa Janković (Timișoara, 1806 – Belgrade, 22 June 1869) was a Serbian lawyer and politician who served as Prime Minister of Serbia, Minister of External Affairs, Minister of Justice and Minister of Education. He held pro-Austrian political views and was a close associate of Toma Vučić Perišić.

He attended high school in Timișoara and went to study law in Budapest. In 1834 he arrived in Serbia and was appointed clerk at the chancery of Prince Miloš Obrenović. In 1839 he returned to the Prince's chancery, only to witness the coming to power of the Karađorđević dynasty headed by Prince Alexander Karađorđević, who accelerated Aleksa Janković's career.

As of 1864 Janković became an honorary member of the Society Of Serbian Letters, which later became the Serbian Academy of Sciences and Arts.

References

1806 births
1869 deaths
Government ministers of Serbia
Foreign ministers of Serbia
Justice ministers
19th-century Serbian people
Interior ministers of Serbia
Education ministers of Serbia
Justice ministers of Serbia